The Secret: Dare to Dream is a 2020 American drama film based on the 2006 self-help book The Secret by Rhonda Byrne. Directed by Andy Tennant, from a screenplay he wrote with Bekah Brunstetter and Rick Parks, it stars Katie Holmes, Josh Lucas, Jerry O'Connell, and Celia Weston.

The film was released in the United States through video on demand, and theatrically in several countries, on July 31, 2020, by Lionsgate, Roadside Attractions and Gravitas Ventures.

Plot
Miranda Wells is a hard-working young widow struggling to raise three children while managing in her boyfriend Tucker's seafood restaurant in New Orleans. Bray Johnson is an engineering professor from Vanderbilt University looking to meet Miranda to deliver an envelope.

After Bray misses Miranda on his first try going to her house, they inadvertently meet when she rearends his truck with her car. He offers to fix Miranda's broken bumper, so she gives him a ride to her home and invites him to stay for dinner. Until they drive back he doesn't realize she is the same Miranda he came looking for. Bray and Greg fix the car bumper together.

Miranda's kids, Bess, Greg and Missy, want pizza for dinner, which Miranda cannot afford. Bray stresses the power of positive thinking just as a delivery person appears at the door with pizza. As Bray has never found the moment to give the envelope to Miranda, before departing, he leaves it in the mailbox. 

A hurricane hits that night, washing away the mailbox and causing a tree to fall through the roof. Bray comes back to check on them, sees the mailbox is missing, and offers to fix the roof as best as he can. Miranda and the kids leave with the kids' grandmother, Matt's mother Bobby, to stay over at her place while the house is fixed.

The next day, Tucker proposes to Miranda publicly at the restaurant's reopening, which she reluctantly accepts. Bobby offers to stay with the kids that night so Tucker and Miranda can be alone.

The day after, at Missy's 16th birthday party, Bobby shows Miranda a news article about an invention with Bray's photo. The invention was also something her late husband Matt was linked to. Bobby assumes that Bray stole it from her son, so Miranda confronts Bray. He explains that he and Matt were working on it together but in the fateful plane crash he died and Bray survived. He tries to explain that his sole purpose in coming was to give her a copy of the patent. Miranda doesn't believe him and asks him to leave.

Bray sends another copy of the patent to Miranda, who realise the money from it would solve their family's problems. The family finds the old mailbox with the original copy of the patent, confirming that Bray was telling the truth. Miranda calls off her engagement with Tucker knowing she does not truly love him.

A few days later, Miranda ends up at Bray's house to clear the air and meets his sister, who exclaims that Bray has gone to Miranda's. They meet at a Waffle House, embracing with warmth and genuine affection.

Cast

 Katie Holmes as Miranda Wells
 Josh Lucas as Bray Johnson
 Jerry O'Connell as Tucker Middendorf
 Celia Weston as Bobby
 Sarah Hoffmeister as Missy Wells
 Aidan Brennan as Greg Wells
 Chloe Lee as Bess Wells
 Katrina Begin as Jennifer
 Sydney Tennant as Sloane
 Cory Scott Allen as Matt Wells
 Jeremy Warner as The Pizza Guy

Production
In August 2017, it was announced Katie Holmes had joined the cast of the film, with Andy Tennant directing from a screenplay he wrote alongside Bekah Brunstetter and Rick Parks, based on the 2006 self-help book The Secret by Rhonda Byrne. The book has been translated into 50 languages and appeared on the New York Times bestseller list for 190 weeks. In September 2018, Josh Lucas joined the cast of the film. In November 2018, Jerry O'Connell and Celia Weston joined the cast of the film.

Principal photography began on October 30, 2018, in New Orleans.

Release
In November 2019, Roadside Attractions and Gravitas Ventures acquired distribution rights to the film. It was scheduled to be released on April 17, 2020, however due to the COVID-19 pandemic it was pulled from the schedule. Roadside Attractions originally stated that it would announce a new theatrical release "[o]nce clarity for a safe and comfortable moviegoing experience is established", but the film's theatrical release was eventually cancelled. Instead, it debuted through video on demand on July 31, 2020.

Reception

VOD sales 
In its debut weekend, The Secret: Dare to Dream was the top-rented film on FandangoNow, second at Apple TV, seventh on the iTunes Store, and 10th on Spectrum. In its second weekend the film finished second on FandangoNow's weekly rental chart, and placed on two others.

Critical response 
The website's critics consensus reads: "For those who Dare to Dream of a worthy dramatic adaptation of The Secret, this sodden romance will prove a disappointment too painful to visualize." On Metacritic, the film has a weighted average score of 32 out of 100, based on 11 critics, indicating "generally unfavorable reviews".

For her performance in this film, Katie Holmes won a Golden Raspberry Award for Worst Actress.

References

External links
 
 

2020 films
American drama films
Films based on non-fiction books
Films directed by Andy Tennant
Films scored by George Fenton
Films not released in theaters due to the COVID-19 pandemic
Films shot in Louisiana
Roadside Attractions films
2020s English-language films
2020s American films